Mohammad Ayub Khan, better known as Master Ayub, is a Pakistani educator, philanthropist and civil servant who is known for spending his after-job hours and weekends teaching students in an open-air school in F-6 sector, Islamabad.

Master Ayub has received the Pride of Performance award for his efforts over the decades.

Personal life
Ayub, originally belonging to Mandi Bahauddin, is a firefighter with the fire brigade. He has been in Islamabad for 38 years. Ayub started his open air, free of cost school when he moved to Islamabad for the job at fire brigade.

Free of cost teaching
Ayub started teaching a group of four students in Islamabad's sector, F-6. The students have been increasing exponentially and currently, 240 students are enrolled in the school. All the students studying at the school are underprivileged and are being taught free of cost.

See also
 Education in Pakistan

References

Date of birth unknown
Living people
Pakistani civil servants
Pakistani firefighters
Pakistani nonprofit executives
Pakistani philanthropists
Pakistani school principals and headteachers
People from Islamabad
People from Mandi Bahauddin District
Punjabi people
Recipients of the Pride of Performance
Pakistani educators
Year of birth missing (living people)